Gigi Fernández and Helena Suková were the defending champions, but Suková did not compete this year. Fernández teamed up with Rennae Stubbs and lost in the quarterfinals to Jill Hetherington and Shaun Stafford.

Jana Novotná and Arantxa Sánchez Vicario won the title by defeating Ginger Helgeson and Rachel McQuillan 6–3, 6–3 in the final.

Seeds
The top four seeds received a bye into the second round.

Draw

Finals

Top half

Bottom half

References

External links
 Official results archive (ITF)
 Official results archive (WTA)

Southern California Open
1994 WTA Tour